Theresa Magdalena "Tisa" Farrow is a retired American actress and model.

Early life
Farrow was born in Los Angeles, California, the daughter of Irish-born actress Maureen O'Sullivan and Australian-born film director John Farrow. She is the youngest of their four girls and three boys; her siblings are Mia (b. 1945), Prudence, Stephanie, Michael Damien, Patrick Joseph, and John Charles.

Like most of her siblings, Tisa received a strict and mainly Catholic education. In her high school freshman year she enrolled at the progressive New Lincoln School in New York City. She left school of her own volition in the middle of the 11th grade. She then worked as a waitress. In her own words, she also "spent a long time going around town trying out for commercials" - with no success: "I would always run into some career woman who disliked me right away because she didn't like my sister Mia."

Career
Farrow's first film role was in Homer. Farrow then starred in René Clément's And Hope to Die (1972), the drama Some Call It Loving (1973), and the comedy Only God Knows (1974).

Farrow was featured semi-nude in a photo article in the July 1973 issue of Playboy, photographed by Mario Casilli.

In the second half of the 1970s, Farrow acted in the Italian-Canadian action thriller Strange Shadows in an Empty Room (1976) directed by Alberto de Martino, and starred in the made-for-television horror film The Initiation of Sarah (1978), James Toback's first feature production Fingers (1978) alongside Harvey Keitel, and in the Canadian film Search and Destroy (1979).

In Woody Allen's Manhattan (1979), she has a cameo appearance.

From mid-1979 to 1980, Farrow took leading roles in three Italian genre films: in Lucio Fulci's horror film Zombi 2 (1979), Antonio Margheriti's Vietnam War film The Last Hunter (1980), and Joe D'Amato's horror film Antropophagus (1980).

Filmography

References

External links

Living people
American film actresses
American people of Australian descent
American people of English descent
American people of Irish descent
Actresses from Los Angeles County, California
20th-century American actresses
21st-century American women
Year of birth missing (living people)